Chrysura simplex is a species of cuckoo wasps, insects in the family Chrysididae.

Subspecies
Subspecies include:
Chrysura simplex simplex (Dahlbom, 1854)
Chrysura simplex ampliata (Linsenmaier, 1968)

Distribution
This species is present in part of Europe (Albania, Austria, France, Italy, Greece, Czech Republic, Hungary, Poland, Slovakia, Spain, Switzerland and Ukraine) and in North Africa (Algeria, Libya, Morocco, Tunisia).

Habitat
These cuckoo wasps mainly inhabit grassy cliffs and sunny slopes. They can be found on plants of Euphorbia, Sedum, Daucus carota and Crepis hieracioides.

Description
These wasps have a stout body with a gray pubescence. The head is metallic blue-green, nearly square, rather big, closely punctulate, with a flat face and short antennae. Also the thorax is densely dotted, with blach hairs and a basically shining blue-green coloration. Mesonotum is shining blue. The abdomen is robust. almost oval, densely punctate and silky-shiny, with red to purple-red coloration, without black patches. The wings are pale brown and hyaline. In males the red colouration is more intense.

Biology
Chrysura simplex is a univoltine species. Adults fly from mid-June until mid-July. They especially feed on flowers of Euphorbiaceae and Apiaceae. The larvae live as parasites of Megachile parietina, Hoplitis anthocopoides and Osmia cornuta.

Bibliography
Goulet H. & Huber J.T. (eds), 1993. Hymenoptera of the world: an identification guide to families.
Kimsey L.S. & Bohart R.M., 1990 (1991) - The chrysidid wasps of the world.
Rosa P., 2006 - I Crisidi della Valle d'Aosta.

References

External links

  Insect Foto
 Chrysididae

Chrysidinae
Insects described in 1854
Hymenoptera of Europe
Taxa named by Anders Gustaf Dahlbom